Paramount Global has owned and operated several animation studios since its founding on March 16, 1952 as the original Viacom, throughout the first and second incarnation and CBS Corporation (previously Westinghouse Electric Corporation). The two companies merged into one on December 4, 2019.

Currently, Nickelodeon Animation Studios, Paramount Animation (though Paramount Pictures), and CBS Eye Animation Productions operate their flagship brands.

Full list

CBS Entertainment Group

CBS Eye Animation Productions 

Founded in 2018, CBS Eye Animation Productions is the animation production arm of CBS Studios. Its first projects announced were two Star Trek animated series, Star Trek: Lower Decks and Star Trek: Prodigy (for Nickelodeon & Paramount+).

Cable networks

Paramount Media Networks

Nickelodeon Animation Studio 

Founded in 1990, Nickelodeon Animation Studio was originally named Games Animation (previously Games Productions Inc.); it oversaw the production of animated programs for Nickelodeon such as Doug, Rugrats, and The Ren & Stimpy Show with Rocko's Modern Life becoming Games Animation's first fully in-house series produced for the network. In 1998-99 the studio's name was changed to Nickelodeon Animation Studio following relocation from Studio City, California to Burbank with a second facility in New York City in 1999.

MTV Animation 

Established in 1986, MTV Animation began by producing several animated shorts that aired as bumpers for its namesake network. While its department is often grouped with that of Nickelodeon's, the two entities are completely separate. MTV's cartoons typically have more dark humor, sexual jokes, graphic violence, and pop culture references than its sister studio. In the early 2000s, MTV Animation branched out to Web-based content. As of recently, the current state of the studio remains unknown.

Paramount International Networks

Rainbow S.p.A. 

In February 2011, Viacom purchased a 30% ownership stake in the Italian animation studio Rainbow S.p.A. for 62 million euros (US$83 million). Since then, the studio has collaborated with ViacomCBS' other company, Nickelodeon, on multiple shows, including Winx Club and Club 57.

Paramount Pictures Corporation

Paramount Animation 

Founded in 2011, Paramount Animation is the animation division of Paramount Pictures that creates animated theatrical films. The company serves after a successor to Paramount Cartoon Studios (and the previous animation studios before it).

Projects

Fleischer Studios 

Fleisher Studios was founded in 1921 by Max Fleischer and his brother Dave Fleischer who originally ran the pioneering company. The studios are most well known for creating famous characters such as Koko the Clown, Betty Boop, Bimbo, and producing shorts for licensed characters such as Popeye the Sailor and Superman. In 1942, Fleisher Studios renamed Famous Studios (later Paramount Cartoon Studios) after Paramount Pictures acquired it. The studio has also released animated feature films under Paramount.

Projects

Famous Studios/Paramount Cartoon Studios 

Famous Studios (later renamed Paramount Cartoon Studios in 1956) was Paramount Pictures' first animation division. It was founded as a successor to Fleischer Studios after Paramount seized its founders, Max and Dave Fleischer's control in 1941. The studio's productions included three series started by the Fleischer Popeye the Sailor, Superman, and Screen Songs. It also featured Harvey Comic characters such as Little Audrey, Little Lulu, Casper the Friendly Ghost, Honey Halfwitch, Herman and Katnip, Baby Huey, and the anthology Noveltoons series. After the animation studio shut down in 1967, Paramount sold most of these original characters back to their original owners.

Terrytoons 

Terrytoons was founded in 1929 by Paul Terry, Frank Moser, and Joseph Coffman. The studio has brought many cartoon characters such as Mighty Mouse, Heckle & Jeckle, Gandy Goose, Sourpuss, Dinky Duck, Luno, and Farmer Al Falfa (from Bray Productions, the studios' predecessor). 20th Century Fox (and its precursor Fox Films) originally released Terrytoons theatrical shorts. In 1955, CBS purchased the studio. The theatrical library was transferred under Paramount Pictures (via the ViacomCBS re-merger). Its television library still remmains under CBS Entertainment Group.

Notes

References

External links 

 Fleischer Studios
 Terrytoons
 MTV Animation
 Nickelodeon Animation Studios
 Nickelodeon Digital
 Paramount Animation
 CBS Eye Animation Productions
Rainbow S.p.A.
Colorado Film

 
Paramount Global studios
Nickelodeon Animation Studio
CBS Eye Animation Productions
Paramount Pictures
Paramount Global-related lists